Shariff Mohammed Ahmed is an Indian politician and the Chairman of Andhra Pradesh Legislative Council. He assumed charge on 7 February 2019 and is a member of Telugu Desam Party. His tenure ended on 31 May 2021.

Early life
Shariff was born to Mohammed Khasim Sharif and hails from Narasapuram in West Godavari district in Andhra Pradesh. He completed his graduation with a Bachelor of Commerce degree from Sri Y N College at Narasapuram. He did Master of Commerce in 1978 and LLB in 1979 from Bhopal University.

Political career
Shariff was a part of the Telugu Desam Party since its inception by N. T. Rama Rao in 1982. He held various positions in the party including national general secretary. Sharif was appointed as a Member of Legislative Council and later as the government whip in the Council.

On 7 February 2019, Sharif was elected as the Chairman of Andhra Pradesh Legislative Council. His tenure ended on 31 May 2021.

References

External links
 
 Andhra Pradesh State Portal

1950s births
21st-century Indian politicians
Living people
Telugu Desam Party politicians
Members of the Andhra Pradesh Legislative Council
Andhra Pradesh politicians
Chairs of the Andhra Pradesh Legislative Council
People from West Godavari district